Simpang Pulai (Jawi: سيمڤڠ ڤولاي; ; Tamil: சிம்பாங் புலாய்) is a town in Kinta District, Perak, Malaysia.

Transportation

Car
As mentioned earlier, highway Federal Route 1, the premier north–south federal highway of Peninsular Malaysia, passes here.

Simpang Pulai is perhaps famous for being the newest gateway for Perakian motorists to the east coast states of Pahang, Kelantan and Terengganu – the Second East–West Highway (Federal Route 185) begins here, passes through Cameron Highlands in Pahang, then Gua Musang in Kelantan before terminating in Kuala Jenderis in Hulu Terengganu.

The PLUS Expressway exit 137 serves Simpang Pulai.

Other features
A Ria Moda Jakel Trading Textile Company opened its branch here at the corner lot of the Simpang Pulai intersection.

Kinta District
Towns in Perak